The Sliema Batteries were a series of artillery batteries in Sliema, Malta, that were built by Maltese insurgents during the French blockade of 1798–1800. They were the first in a chain of batteries, redoubts and entrenchments encircling the French positions in Marsamxett and the Grand Harbour.

The batteries were built by Vincenzo Borg. The following batteries are known to have existed:
Imrabat Battery: This was armed with two or four mortars. It had an underground casemate (similar to the one at Għargħar Battery) and a gun crew shelter. It was surrounded by extensive walls and had a bastion.
 Ischina Battery: This was a small battery equipped with an 18-pounder, and was situated in a field known as ta' Xini. It was possibly located at Fond Għadir, close to where Sliema Point Battery was later built. Vincenzo Borg often stood guard at this battery.
Sqaq Kappara Battery: This battery overlooked and bombarded Fort Manoel.
Six walled positions along present day Main Street, including two batteries at Għar il-Lembi, armed with two and three guns.
Other batteries known as tal-Blat and ta' Sbiese also existed.

The Sliema batteries still existed in 1811, but like the other French blockade fortifications, they were dismantled, possibly sometime after 1814. No traces of the batteries can be seen today.

References

Batteries in Malta
Sliema
Military installations established in 1798
Demolished buildings and structures in Malta
French occupation of Malta
Vernacular architecture in Malta
Limestone buildings in Malta
1798 establishments in Malta
18th-century fortifications
18th Century military history of Malta